Pengelly is a hamlet in Cornwall.

Pengelly may also refer to:

Pengelly (surname)
Pengelly Landing
Mount Pengelly